Andrew John Seigle (born May 15, 1972) is a Filipino-American retired professional basketball player in the Philippine Basketball Association. He was also a member of the Philippine national basketball team. He is the brother of Danny Seigle, also a basketball player in the same league. Their mother, Blesylda Yadao, is of Chinese Filipino descent while his father is a White American.

Career
He was considered one of the most dominant and best defensive players early in his PBA Career. He spent most of his time in his last season on the sidelines rather than on the court as he played only 30 games and just 8.9 minutes of playing time per outing, due to ACL injuries in both knees. As a result, the 6-9 center posted a career-low averages of 2.6 points and 2.2 rebounds.

Seigle only got a one-year extension from the Ginebra management and with the arrival of Rafi Reavis and Billy Mamaril, his minutes suffered. He retired in 2007 after winning his last championship in the PBA.

Philippine National Team
Seigle has played twice for the Philippine national basketball team. The first was in 1998 when he played for the Philippine Centennial Team in the 1998 Asian Games held in Bangkok, Thailand where he averaged 7.1 points and 2.5 rebounds per game. The second was in 2002 when he again played for the national team during the 2002 Asian Games held in Busan, South Korea.

References

External links
 Andy Seigle Profile at PBA.ph
 Player Profile at PBA-Online!

1972 births
Living people
American sportspeople of Chinese descent
American sportspeople of Filipino descent
Asian Games bronze medalists for the Philippines
Asian Games medalists in basketball
Barangay Ginebra San Miguel players
Basketball players at the 1998 Asian Games
Basketball players at the 2002 Asian Games
Basketball players from Pennsylvania
Centers (basketball)
Citizens of the Philippines through descent
New Orleans Privateers men's basketball players
Magnolia Hotshots players
Philippine Basketball Association All-Stars
Philippines men's national basketball team players
Filipino men's basketball players
Power forwards (basketball)
Sportspeople from Scranton, Pennsylvania
TNT Tropang Giga players
American men's basketball players
Medalists at the 1998 Asian Games
TNT Tropang Giga draft picks